|}

The Winter Novices' Hurdle is a Grade 2 National Hunt hurdle race in Great Britain which is open to horses aged four years or older. It is run at Sandown Park over a distance of about 2 miles and 4 furlongs (2 miles, 3 furlongs and 173 yards, or 3,980 metres), and during its running there are nine hurdles to be jumped. The race is for novice hurdlers, and it is scheduled to take place each year in early December.

Between 1992 and 1999 the distance of the race was 2 miles and 6 furlongs, and prior to 1992 it was run over 2 miles 5 furlongs and 75 yards. The only winner to subsequently win the championship event in this division is Barton, who won the 1999 Royal & SunAlliance Novices' Hurdle. From 2011 to 2016 the race was sponsored by Neptune Investment Management and run under the title of the Neptune Investment Management Novices' Hurdle. It has been sponsored by the Ballymore Group since 2017.

Records
Leading jockey since 1987 (3 wins):
 Tony McCoy – See More Business (1995), Lightning Strike (2007), Taquin de Seuil (2012)
 Richard Johnson - What's Up Boys (1999), Fingal Bay (2011), Killala Quay (2013)
 Wayne Hutchinson - Manyriverstocross (2009), Label Des Obeaux (2015), Alsa Mix (2018)

Leading trainer since 1987 (5 wins):
 Alan King – Junior (2008), Manyriverstocross (2009), Label Des Obeaux (2015), Messire Des Obeaux (2016), Alsa Mix (2018)
 Paul Nicholls - See More Business (1995), Ladalko (2004), Neptune Collonges (2005), Enrilo (2019), Henri the Second (2022)

Winners since 1987

See also
 Horse racing in Great Britain
 List of British National Hunt races

References
  Racing Post:
, 

 pedigreequery.com – Winter Novices' Hurdle – Sandown.

National Hunt races in Great Britain
Sandown Park Racecourse
National Hunt hurdle races